This article contains information about the literary events and publications of 1788.

Events
May – Joseph Johnson and Thomas Christie found the radical Analytical Review in London.
May 10 – Sweden's Royal Dramatic Theatre (Kungliga Dramatiska Teatern) is founded.

New books

Fiction
Bernardin de St. Pierre – Paul et Virginie
Charlotte Turner Smith – Emmeline; or The Orphan of the Castle
Mary Wollstonecraft – Mary: A Fiction
Yuan Mei – What the Master Would Not Discuss

Children
Thomas Day – A History of Little Jack
François Guillaume Ducray-Duminil – Alexis, ou la Maisonnette dans les bois (Alexis or the Little House in the Woods)
Mary Wollstonecraft – Original Stories from Real Life, with Conversations Calculated to Regulate the Affections, and Form the Mind to Truth and Goodness

Drama
Frances Brooke – Marian
Hannah Cowley – The Fate of Sparta
Olympe de Gouges – Zamore et Mirza (published)
Elizabeth Inchbald – Animal Magnetism
John O'Keeffe – Aladdin

Poetry

Maria and Harriet Falconar
Poems
Poems on Slavery
Samuel Jackson Pratt – Sympathy

Non-fiction
Anthony Benezet – Some Historical Account of Guinea
Ralph Broome – Letters of Simkin the Second to his dear brother in Wales, containing a humble description of the trial of Warren Hastings, Esq. (further instalments up to 1791)
Edward Gibbon – Volumes IV, V, and VI of The History of the Decline and Fall of the Roman Empire
Alexander Hamilton, James Madison, and John Jay – The Federalist Papers
George Hepplewhite (attr.) – Cabinet Maker and Upholsterers Guide
Immanuel Kant – Critique of Practical Reason (Kritik der praktischen Vernunft)
Hannah More – Thoughts on the Importance of the Manners of the Great to General Society
Richard Porson – Letters to Archdeacon Travis
Thomas Scott – Commentary on the Whole Bible (beginning 174 weekly numbers)

Births
January 22 – George Gordon Byron, 6th Baron Byron, English poet (died 1824)
February 28 – Samuel Bamford, English writer, poet and radical (died 1872)
March 1 – Gheorghe Asachi, Moldavian polymath (died 1869)
March 20 – Thomas Medwin, English poet, biographer and translator (died 1869)
September 22 – Theodore Edward Hook, English man of letters and composer (died 1841)
c. October 14 – Robert Millhouse, English weaver poet (died 1839)
October 24 – Sarah Josepha Hale, American novelist and poet (died 1879)
December 6 – Richard Harris Barham (Thomas Ingoldsby), English novelist, poet and cleric (died 1845)

Deaths
March 31 – Frances Vane, Viscountess Vane (Lady Fanny), English memoirist (born 1715)
May 17 – Dorothea Biehl, Danish dramatist and translator (born 1731)
July 21 – Gaetano Filangieri, Italian philosopher (born 1752)
August 4 – Evan Evans (Ieuan Fardd or Ieuan Brydydd Hir), priest and poet, 57
August 16 – Francisco Javier Alegre, Mexican historian and translator (born 1729)
September 16 – Andrea Spagni, Italian theologian (born 1716)
October 13 – Robert Nugent, 1st Earl Nugent, Irish politician and poet (born 1709)

References

 
Years of the 18th century in literature